A patent examiner (or, historically, a patent clerk) is an employee, usually a civil servant with a scientific or engineering background, working at a patent office. Major employers of patent examiners are the European Patent Office (EPO), the United States Patent and Trademark Office (USPTO), the Japan Patent Office (JPO), and other patent offices around the world.

Duties
Patent examiners review patent applications to determine whether the invention(s) claimed in each of them should be granted a patent or whether the application should instead be refused. One of the most important tasks of a patent examiner is to review the disclosure in the application and to compare it to the prior art. This involves reading and understanding a patent application, searching the prior art (including prior patent applications and patents, scientific literature databases, etc.) to determine what contribution the invention makes over the prior art, and issuing office actions to explain to the applicants and their representatives (i.e., patent attorneys or agents) any objections that may exist against the grant of a patent. In other words, an examiner reviews a patent application substantively to determine whether it complies with the legal requirements for granting of a patent.  A claimed invention must meet patentability requirements of novelty, inventive step or non-obviousness, industrial application (or utility) and sufficiency of disclosure.

Examiners are expected to be efficient in their work and to determine patentability within a limited amount of time.  Some patent applications are easy for an examiner to assess, but others require considerably more time.  This has given rise to controversy:  On April 13, 2007, a "Coalition of Patent Examiner Representatives" expressed concern that

Offices

European Patent Office 
Patent examiners at the European Patent Office (EPO) carry out examination and opposition procedures for patent applications originating anywhere in the world and seeking protection in any of the member states of the European Patent Organisation. The process involves a search for existing documentation in the technical area of the application (prior art) and communication with the applicant in order to bring the application in line with the legal requirements of the European Patent Convention. For every patent application, a division formed by three examiners must decide whether the application is granted or not, and in which scope.

EPO examiners are organized in a branched structured by their technical field of expertise and examine patent applications in three official languages, English, French, and German. They are recruited among nationals of the member states and work in one of the EPO offices in Munich, The Hague and Berlin.

Candidates for examiner positions must meet certain minimum requirements:
 EPO member state nationality;
 degree in engineering or in science;
 good knowledge of two languages out of German, English and French with a willingness to learn the third.

Some examiners have work experience in industry, but such experience is not required. EPO examiners are also reportedly required to speak three languages fluently.

Most EPO examiners are represented by SUEPO, a trade union.

United States Patent and Trademark Office 
Patent examiners at the United States Patent and Trademark Office (USPTO) examine patent applications for claims of new inventions. Examiners make determinations of patentability based on policies and guidance from this agency, in compliance with federal laws (Title 35 of the United States Code), rules, judicial precedents, and guidance from agency administrators.  These determinations are appealable as a matter of right in United States district courts and then at the Federal Circuit. The decisions of the latter can be appealed at the U.S. Supreme Court, but only at the court's discretion. 

Responsibilities for a patent examiner at the USPTO include:
 reviewing patent applications to determine if they comply with basic format, rules and legal requirements;
 determining the scope of the invention claimed by the inventor;
 searching for relevant technologies to compare similar prior inventions with the invention claimed in the patent application; and
 communicating findings as to the patentability of an applicant's invention via a written action to inventors/patent practitioners.

Examiners are hired at the GS-5, GS-7, GS-9 or GS-11 grade levels.

Patent examiners in the U.S. have responsibilities that are commensurate with their GS level. Promotions from GS-7 to GS-14 are non-competitive. At GS-13 they are eligible to start the "Partial Signatory Authority" program, a testing phase to see if an examiner can apply patent concepts (e.g. obviousness and novelty) and laws (35 USC). Upon passing the "Partial Signatory Program", a patent examiner is given signatory authority to sign all of their own non-final rejections and other non-final communications to applicants.  After a waiting period a patent examiner may take part in an additional testing phase known as the "Full Signatory Authority" (FSA) program. When a patent examiner has passed the FSA program, they are given "Full Signatory Authority" and can sign all of their own "office actions" (e.g. allowances, rejections) without review and approval by a supervisor.  Such examiners are also able to review and sign actions of "junior examiners" (patent examiners without signatory authority). Upon completion of the "Full Signatory Authority program", an examiner is advanced from GS-13 to GS-14 and is referred to as a "primary examiner". 

Supervisors at the USPTO are GS-15 employees who are necessarily primary examiners now called Supervisory Patent Examiners (formerly Supervisory Primary Examiners) (SPE, colloquially called "spee"). They apply for positions competitively and receive management training inside the office. They are responsible for an Art Unit of patent examiners, typically 8-15 examiners who examine cases in the same area of technology (e.g. GPS devices and aircraft are handled by different art units). Responsibilities include training new examiners, reviewing and signing office actions of junior examiners and acting as an advocate of the examiners they are responsible for to a variety of parties (e.g. other managers in the office, patent applicants and their attorneys). They are the lowest rung of the USPTO's management chain of command, and the only part of management that is paid as part of the general schedule (GS). Higher paid managers are part of the Senior Executive Service and are technically political appointees. For example, a primary examiner (GS-14) and her SPE (GS-15) are part of the general schedule and cannot be fired as part of an administration change, but the SPE's boss (a "technology center" director paid at SES-1), can be asked to resign by the president, at his pleasure.

According to the USPTO, an examiner is measured entirely by his own performance, without regard to the performance of others.  The two most important performance statistics are referred to as "production" (the number of applications processed in the allotted time) and "docket management" (compliance with goals for responding to applicant communications within the allotted time). Legal, technical and automation training is provided to examiners at the USPTO.

To work as an examiner at the USPTO, a person must be a U.S. citizen and pass a background investigation. Examiners also must have a college degree in engineering or science. The Technology Centers at the USPTO are divided into chemistry (or chemical engineering), electrical engineering, and mechanical engineering, so college degrees in these areas are typically preferred.  In recent years, however, new technologies have been important areas of innovation, so the USPTO employs people with training in biotechnology, business methods, geology, mathematics, and many other disciplines.

Experienced examiners have an option of working primarily from home through a hoteling program implemented in 2006 by the USPTO.

Notable patent examiners

See also 
 Law clerk
 Patent engineer
 Patent Office Professional Association, the United States patent examiners trade union
 Trademark examiner
 United States Patent Classification

References and notes

External links
 John W. Schoen, "U.S. patent office swamped by backlog; Without more funding, wait time could top 5 years". MSNBC, April 27, 2004. (ed., comments on problems and that 2900 new examiners are being sought by the USPTO.)
 Report to Congressional Committees 2005 "USPTO Has Made Progress in Hiring Examiners, but Challenges to Retention Remain" " "

Legal professions